Tanukichan (born Hannah van Loon) is an American singer-songwriter based in San Francisco. Her debut album Sundays was released on July 13, 2018 via Company Records with production by Chaz Bear of Toro y Moi. Following the release of Sundays, van Loon supported the musical act Kero Kero Bonito on their 2018 tour. Prior to Sundays, van Loon independently released her EP Radiolove and an early version of the song “Bitter Medicine” in 2016.

On March 3, 2023, Tanukichan released her second album GIZMO on Company Records, also produced by Chaz Bear.

Early life 
Van Loon was raised in the San Francisco Bay Area in a Christian family. She grew up performing classical music, studying keyboard, violin, guitar, and bass. Van Loon first began playing in ensembles as a fiddle player in a bluegrass band. During this time she was enrolled at University of California, Berkeley, majoring in mathematics. She later spent four years in San Francisco pop band Trails and Ways.

Van Loon's stage name refers to the addition of the Japanese honorific chan to the name of the tanuki, an animal which has significance in much of Japanese folklore. While growing up, van Loon was often referred to as "Hannah-chan".

Discography

Studio albums
 Sundays (2018)
 GIZMO (2023)

Singles and EPs

Singles
 “Bitter Medicine” (2016)
 “Make Believe” (2022)
 "Don't Give Up" (2022)

The instrumentation and mixing on the single release of "Bitter Medicine" is significantly different from the version that later appears on Sundays. Despite this, there is no formal acknowledgement that this version is a demo.

Extended plays
 Radiolove - EP (2016)

References 

Living people
American indie rock musicians
American women songwriters
Asian American music
University of California, Berkeley alumni
Year of birth missing (living people)
American alternative rock musicians
Singers from San Francisco
21st-century American women musicians
American women singer-songwriters
Singer-songwriters from California
21st-century American women singers
21st-century American singers